Eva Margaret Nielsen (born 7 March 1950 in Kvænangen) is a Norwegian politician for the Labour Party. She was elected to the Norwegian Parliament from Finnmark in 2001, and has been re-elected on one occasion. She had previously served as a deputy representative during the term 1989–1993.

On the local level she was elected to the executive committee of Alta municipal council from in 1983, and later served as mayor from 1991 to 2001. She chaired the local party chapter from 1989 to 1992. During the same period she was also deputy leader of the county chapter as well as a member of the Labour Party national board.

References

1950 births
Living people
People from Kvænangen
People from Alta, Norway
Labour Party (Norway) politicians
Mayors of places in Finnmark
Members of the Storting
Women mayors of places in Norway
21st-century Norwegian politicians
21st-century Norwegian women politicians
Women members of the Storting